Panjin Red Beach Sports Centre Jinxiu Stadium (盘锦红海滩体育中心锦绣体育场) or simply Panjin Jinxiu Stadium (盘锦锦绣体育场) is a multi-purpose stadium in Panjin, China. It is currently used mostly for association football matches. The stadium holds 35,600 people. Liaoning Whowin F.C. are the tenants.

External links
Stadium picture

References

Football venues in China
Multi-purpose stadiums in China